R. B. Sloan Jr. is a  Republican member of the North Carolina General Assembly representing the state's forty-first Senate district, including constituents in Alexander and Iredell counties.  A corporate executive from Mooresville, North Carolina, Sloan is currently (2003-2004 session) serving in his first term in the state Senate.

References

External links

North Carolina state senators
Living people
21st-century American politicians
Year of birth missing (living people)